Vostřák is a Czech surname. Notable people with the surname include:

Pavel Vostřák (born 1972), Czech ice hockey player
Zbyněk Vostřák (1920–1985), Czech composer

Czech-language surnames
Surnames of Czech origin